The Infinity Watch is the name of three fictional organizations appearing in American comic books published by Marvel Comics. The first version of Infinity Watch was gathered in Warlock and the Infinity Watch #1, and starred in that series until it ended with issue #42. The six members were the self-appointed guardians of the Infinity Stones, which were each given to a single member in order to safeguard against anyone else assembling them into the Infinity Gauntlet.

Fictional group history

Adam Warlock's first version
When Adam Warlock obtains possession of the all-powerful Infinity Gauntlet (that contained the six Infinity Gems) from Thanos, he is ordered by the Living Tribunal to separate the Gems so that they might never be used in conjunction again. Warlock forms the Infinity Watch, entrusting each member with an Infinity Gem to protect (keeping the identity of the sixth member a secret even from his fellow Infinity Watch-members). Under the Gauntlet's influence, Warlock is not in his right mind, and even he wondered if he had made the right choices later on.

Initially, Warlock did not intend for the Watch to become a team; he believes the gems would be safer if they were all kept separately, but Warlock's old enemy, the Man-Beast, abducts four Infinity Watch members and manipulated their gems in an attempt to destroy Warlock. After the Man-Beast is defeated, the Infinity Watch chose to stay together as a heroic team, except for Thanos. However, Thanos, having undergone a period of humility after the Infinity Gauntlet affair, did not abuse his gem, but kept it safe.

Warlock negotiates a deal with the Mole Man to use a castle on Monster Island as the Watch's base. With help from The Avengers and Warlock, the United Nations recognize the Mole Man's sovereignty of Monster Island (after a fatality-free battle with the Watch). The Infinity Watch goes on to deal with many other foes, most of them interested in the power the Gems could confer on their owner. Other opponents had personal interests in the Infinity Watch members.

An amnesic man appears on Monster Island and was taken in by the Watch despite Gamora's warnings. Gamora, holding the Time Gem, has visions of this man killing Adam Warlock. The Watch names the man Maxam after a symbol found on his belt and he joins the Watch, despite a violent outburst against Warlock.

The Watch also becomes involved in the events of the Infinity War and the Infinity Crusade, both stemming from the events of the Infinity Gauntlet.

A while later Gamora leaves the team after an argument with Adam Warlock. Maxam became the new Guardian of the Time Gem. This causes his memories to return; he is under the belief that Warlock is a danger to his homeworld. Under Moondragon's telepathic influence, Maxam believes that he had broken Warlock's neck and returned to his own world.

Meanwhile, the being known as Rune steals all the Infinity Gems and took them to the Ultraverse. With Gamora, Maxam and the gems gone, the Watch disbands. Although the gems are eventually returned to the Marvel Universe, the Watch has not been fully reestablished yet; however, Adam Warlock, Gamora, and Pip were shown attempting to overthrow the Champion of the Universe's rule of the planet Skardon in the 2004–2005 She-Hulk series, and at one point recruited Drax to aid in their efforts.

Doctor Strange's version
At the end of the "Infinity Countdown" storyline, Doctor Strange used a magic spell to speak to the holders of the Infinity Gems and requested a parley to reform the Infinity Watch. He states to Adam Warlock, Black Widow's clone, Captain Marvel, Star-Lord, and Turk Barrett that they need to safeguard them from such calamities even if one of them is Thanos.

Loki's version
In order to retrieve her soul piece that was trapped in the Soulworld, Gamora using the alias of Requiem, stole the Infinity Stones from Doctor Strange's Infinity Watch, but ended being corrupted by her father's influence and the seductive power of the Infinity Stones. She uses the Infinity Stones, and the Soul Stone, in particular, to not only recover her missing soul but also fold the universe into itself, combining every two souls into a single being. This resulted in the creation of “warped” characters with Loki to be the only one who wasn't merged with another character since he was beside Requiem, nevertheless, before he was placed into this new reality afterward, he was able to lightly influence her while she was committing the act so he could dupe his own version of the Infinity Watch within the Soul World.

Adam Warlock's second version
To prevent the Infinity Stones from being stolen, Adam Warlock gave them a free will so they can choose their own Infinity Watch. The Soul Stone created the Mergiverse, a pocket multiverse that is home of the Secret Warps; the Time Stone chose Hector Bautista / Overtime, an inmate convicted for murder; the Reality Stone chose Ripley Ryan / Star, a former journalist turned supervillainess; and the Space Stone chose Quantum, a test subject used by the Assessor. The remaining members are still unrevealed.

Membership

Members of Adam Warlocks' first version
Many members of the Infinity Watch were chosen for their inability or unwillingness to use their assigned Gem's full potential.

 Adam Warlock - Leader and guardian of the Soul Gem. Warlock expunged the good and evil portions of his personality while holding the gauntlet which limited his ability to exploit aspects of the Soul Gem.  Nevertheless, Warlock did possess a union with the gem that may never have been rivaled before or since.
 Drax the Destroyer - Guardian of the Power Gem. Suffering from brain damage, Drax the Destroyer was only ever capable of tapping unconsciously into his gem's potential, and served only to make his already formidable strength nearly limitless. Mistaking his Power Gem for a jelly bean, Drax swallowed it. Since the gem was indestructible and indigestible, the gem was, as Warlock observed, "as safe there as anywhere." Drax later suffered a blow to the stomach while battling Thor, and relinquished it to him for a time. When Drax regained the gem, his teammates chose to embed it in his belt so that he "could not lose it again without losing his pants."
 Gamora - Original guardian of the Time Gem. Gamora never had any desire or intention to use the Time Gem consciously, though she did experience occasional visions of the future, normally involving seeing Warlock in danger. Warlock chose her out of personal affection, as well as the knowledge that, as one of the galaxy's most capable warriors, she would be able to defend the gem from potential thieves. She kept the Gem in a purse-like pocket on her belt, as she feared to knowingly exploit its powers.
 Maxam - Second guardian of the Time Gem.
 Moondragon - Guardian of the Mind Gem. Already an exceptional telepath, Moondragon gained almost limitless telepathic and telekinetic abilities from the Mind Gem, but her previous failures and damages to her ego led her to lack the confidence to exploit its greater powers.  In addition, given her less than trustworthy past, Warlock chose to install safeguards into the gem to assure her good behavior. Among these safeguards was an inability to read the minds of the other holders of the Gems.
 Pip the Troll - Guardian of the Space Gem. Pip was somewhat cowardly and self-preservatory, and would keep his Space Gem safe because he would teleport to safety at the first sign of trouble. He also did not possess above-average intelligence, and so was not at risk of attempting to exploit the gem for anything more than simple teleportation of himself and others. Pip kept the Gem between his toes, explaining, "A gem on the forehead ain't my look." It was implied that Pip may have hidden the gem in his posterior region.
 Thanos - Ally and guardian of the Reality Gem. While Thanos' possession of the Reality Gem could grant him virtually anything that he desired, a temporarily resurrected Captain Marvel suggested that Thanos was chosen by Warlock because he was the only being in the universe wise enough not to use it. He came to understand when he held the Gauntlet that greater power would not satisfy him. He also knew that the Reality Gem was in its own way the most dangerous of the Gems, and required the simultaneous use of the other Gems to keep its powers under control.

Members of Doctor Strange's version
 Doctor Strange - Leader and guardian of the Time Gem.
 Adam Warlock - Guardian of the Soul Gem.
 Black Widow - Clone of the original and guardian of the Space Gem.
 Captain Marvel - Guardian of the Reality Gem.
 Star-Lord - Guardian of the Power Gem. It's later revealed that the Power Gem Star-Lord holds is a fake one and the real Stone was with Requiem (Gamora)
 Turk Barrett - Guardian of the Mind Gem.

Members of Loki's version
 Loki - Leader and guardian of the Soul Stone.
 Emma Frost - Guardian of the Power Stone.
 Hulk - Guardian of the Space Stone.
 Ant-Man - Guardian of the Time Stone.
 Kang the Conqueror - Guardian of the Reality Stone.
 Ms. Marvel - Guardian of the Mind Stone.

Members of Adam Warlock's second version
 Overtime (Hector Bautista) - Chosen by the Time Stone.
Quantum - Chosen by the Space Stone.
 Star (Ripley Ryan) - Chosen by the Reality Stone.

Other versions
A team called the Infinity Watch exists in the year 3193, first appearing in Uncanny Avengers #16. Led by Immortus, it includes Captain Marvel, Silver Surfer, Martinex, Yondu, Starhawk, Adam Warlock, and the Vision with the power of The Phoenix.

In other media
In the 2017 video game Marvel vs. Capcom: Infinite, in a scheme concocted by Jedah Dohma and Mistress Death to combine both the Marvel Universe and the Capcom multiverse to bring about equilibrium, utilizing the Infinity Stones, they enlist the help of Thanos and Ultron in infiltrating Abel City. However, he is intercepted by Sigma, and they form an alliance, betraying Thanos and utilizing the Space Stone and Reality Stone to fuse into Ultron-Sigma, and succeeds in combining the Marvel and Capcom realities. After defeating Ultron-Sigma by the end of the game, the Reality Stone is cracked, thus rendering the restoration and separation of the combined realities impossible. Now with no choice but live on the unified world, the heroes resolve to individually protect the Stones one by one to prevent them from ever being used again, as to avert a similar disaster from happening ever again, paralleling the Infinity Watch's purpose.

Collected editions

References

Comics characters introduced in 1992
Marvel Comics titles
Fictional septets
Characters created by Jim Starlin